Tu Chal Pudha is an Indian Marathi language television series. It is directed by Raju Sawant and produced by Zee Studios. It is airing on Zee Marathi by replacing Man Udu Udu Zhala. It stars Deepa Parab, Aditya Vaidya and Dhanashri Kadgaonkar in lead roles.

Summary 
Ashwini, an ideal housewife and a perfect mother, dares to dream big and starts her own business to help fulfil the family's dream.

Special episode (1 hour) 
 27 November 2022
 29 January 2023
 12 March 2023

Cast

Main 
 Deepa Parab as Ashwini Shreyas Waghmare / Ashwini Divakar Mhatre
 Aditya Vaidya as Shreyas Prakash Waghmare
 Dhanashree Kadgaonkar as Shilpi Prakash Waghmare / Shilpi Vidyut Mhatre

Recurring 
Shreyas' family
 Vaishnavi Kalyankar as Mayuri Shreyas Waghmare
 Pihu Gosavi as Kuhu Shreyas Waghmare
 Devendra Dodke as Prakash Waghmare
 Pratibha Goregaonkar as Ujjawala Prakash Waghmare

Ashwini's family
 Deepkar Parkar as Vidyut Divakar Mhatre
 Leena Pandit as Kamalavati Divakar Mhatre
 Yogesh Kelkar as Divakar Mhatre
 Reyansh Juwatkar as Sanjay Vidyut Mhatre

Others
 Vandana Marathe as Jayashri
 Ganesh Sarkate as Baban Pande
 Sneha Majgaonkar as Prajakta Pande
 Darshan Pandya as Anshuman Patnayak
 Maitrey Bapat as Rudra
 Charuta Supekar as Kunda
 Priyanka Deshmane as Rutuja
 Shalaka Chitale as Mrs. Shirke
 Dhruv Datar as Vikram Mohite
 Senjali Masand as Jennifer
 Prachi Pisat as Tara
 Raj More as Prateek
 Siddhi Katkar as Sejal
 Aditya Parab as Rajat
 Raj Gavande as Rachit

Mrs. India contestants
 Monika Singh as Rituparna Das
 Mrunal Bokil as Preeta Balchandran
 Supriti Shivalkar as Ashlesha Shivalkar
 Unknown as Revati Ganeshan
 Varsharani Patel as Niyati Rao
 Dinsha Gulati as Amrit Kaur
 Khushi Singh as Usha Chhada
 Anuja Ashish as Mithila Kalangutakar
 Aditi Karnataki as Radhika Patel
 Amruta Vishwanath as Akriti Zha
 Neha Vaze-Paranjape as Divyanshi Rajput

Awards

References

External links 
 Tu Chal Pudha at ZEE5

Marathi-language television shows
2022 Indian television series debuts
Zee Marathi original programming